Kuperus and Cuperus are Latinized versions of the common Dutch surname Kuiper (and spelling variations) meaning cooper. This process was most common in the province of Friesland. One family changed the spelling from Cuperus to Couperus in the 19th century.

Kuperus 

 Harmen Kuperus (born 1977), Dutch football goalkeeper
 Max Kuperus (born 1936), Dutch astronomer, professor of astrophysics at Utrecht University
9692 Kuperus, a Main Belt asteroid named after him
 Nicola Kuperus (fl. 2003), American musician

Cuperus 

  (1842–1928), Belgian politician and gymnastics promoter
 Watse Cuperus (1891–1966), Dutch journalist, writer and translator

Couperus 

 Elisabeth Couperus-Baud (1867–1960), Dutch translator, wife of Louis
 John Ricus Couperus (1816–1902),  Dutch lawyer in the Dutch East Indies, father of Louis
 Louis Couperus (1863–1923), Dutch novelist and poet; one of the foremost figures in Dutch literature

See also 
 Kuperus (disambiguation)
 Kuipers, variant of surname Kuiper
 Cuypers, variation of the Dutch surname Kuipers
 Kuijpers, variation of the Dutch surname Kuipers
 Kuypers, variation of the Dutch surname Kuipers

References

Dutch-language surnames
Occupational surnames